Tazeh Kand Rural District is in Tazeh Kand District of Parsabad County, Ardabil province, Iran. At the census of 2006, its population was 8,656 in 1,760 households; there were 5,881 inhabitants in 1,468 households at the following census of 2011; and in the most recent census of 2016, the population of the rural district was 5,816 in 1,673 households. The largest of its 15 villages was Takleh-ye Bakhsh-e Do, with 1,515 people.

References 

Parsabad County

Rural Districts of Ardabil Province

Populated places in Ardabil Province

Populated places in Parsabad County